Palaeomystella tibouchinae is a moth of the family Agonoxenidae. It is found in Brazil.

The length of the forewings is 9.2-10.3 mm. They are white with a yellowish brown base. The hindwings are brownish gray.

The larvae feed on Tibouchina barbigera. They create a prosoplasmatic histioid gall which is fleshy when young, but becomes hard like a nut shell when mature and dry. It is usually made on leaf insertion with stalk or on leaf blade. The larvae feed on the inner walls, leaving a smooth surface. No traces of frass are found within the chamber. The larvae are pale yellowish brown and 5.5-8.8 mm long.

Etymology
The species epithet tibouchinae is derived from the generic name of its plant host.

References

Moths described in 2008
Agonoxeninae
Moths of South America